The Srikantadatta Narasimharaja Wadiyar Ground, commonly known as Gangotri Glades Cricket Ground and formerly known as the University of Mysore Platinum Jubilee Cricket Stadium, is a cricket stadium located in the Manasagangotri campus of the University of Mysore in the southern Indian city of Mysore, Karnataka,  named after Prince Srikantadatta Wadiyar.

The Chamundi hills provides an idyllic backdrop, and the iconic Kukkarahalli lake is just a big-hit away. It has a seating capacity of about 15,000. It was constructed by the University of Mysore.

In 1997, the Karnataka State Cricket Association entered into a 20-year agreement with the university to develop and maintain the ground as part of its efforts to promote the game in smaller centres. It was in 2007 that a new pavilion complex was constructed and the stadium got a facelift, making it fit to host Ranji Trophy matches.

This ground is the second home ground for the Karnataka Cricket Team after the M.Chinnaswamy Stadium. This ground is covered with Bermuda Grass.

History and development
The University of Mysore needed a quality cricket ground in Mysore. Nadig Constructions took up the Earth Moving and Ground Creation Activities and completed in 1993. This Ground was Inaugurated on 20 July 1993 by Karnataka Sports Council Chairman Prakash Padukone, BCCI Secretary C Nagaraj, KSCA Vice President Kasturi rangan, KSCA Mysore Zonal Committee Member Satyanarayana S Nadig, Minister for Higher education S M Yahya, University of Mysore Vice Chancelleor Dr. M Madaiah, University of Mysore Registrar Evaluation A K Monnappa, Former Test Cricketer Syed Kirmani, Varsity Senate Member Venkatesh, University of Mysore registrar Pattanayak, Karnataka State Cricket team Captain Karthik Jeswanth and Ideal Jawa Cricketer V Prabhakar.

Ground was later upgraded to stadium in 1996/1997, just in time for the 1997 Women's Cricket World Cup and hosted a game between Denmark women and Pakistan women and later Karnataka State Cricket Association made a 20-year deal to maintain and develop this ground.This wicket is most suitable for batsmen but also provides assistance to bowlers with its pace and bounce. Many games, which are held here are high scoring games but records show that Fast Bowlers have excelled here.

First there is some swing and pace on the track and bowlers have an advantage, but as the game progresses it suits the batsmen.

Matches held

The most notable match held her was finals of 2009–10 Ranji Trophy Final between Mumbai and Karnataka in which Mumbai won by 6 runs in a close game. It has also hosted an International Women's Cricket Match between Denmark and Pakistan in 1997. It also hosts various tournaments such as Karnataka Premier League, Ranji Trophy, Duleep Trophy, Vinoo Mankad Trophy, Cooch Behar Trophy and CK Nayudu Trophy. It is one of the most important stadiums in Karnataka so various tournaments are held here and people throng to watch these matches. This ground is yet to host a men's International match but has hosted many games for India A against various other "A" team opponents. The Knockout stages of Vinoo Mankad Trophy was Also Held here.

Ranji Trophy

Karnataka Premier League(KPL)

Vinoo Mankad Trophy 2011/12

Pre-Quarter-Final-Karnataka Under-19s v Gujarat Under-19s=Karnataka Under-19s won by 12 runs

Quarter-Final-Bengal Under-19s v Madhya Pradesh Under-19s=Madhya Pradesh Under-19s won by 9 wickets

Quarter-Final-Punjab Under-19s v Uttar Pradesh Under-19s=Uttar Pradesh Under-19s won by 5 wickets

Semi-Final-Delhi Under-19s v Madhya Pradesh Under-19s=Madhya Pradesh Under-19s won by 7 wickets

Final-	Madhya Pradesh Under-19s v Uttar Pradesh Under-19s=Uttar Pradesh Under-19s won by 44 runs

Records

Lowest Score=65-Pakistan women vs Denmark women

Highest Score=619/8 dec-Karnataka vs Vidarbha

Highest Individual Score=257-CM Gautam vs Vidarbha

Best Bowling Figures in innings=6/51-P Vijaykumar vs Karnataka

Best Bowling Figures in match=10/108-Sunil Joshi vs Rajasthan

Most Wicket-keeper Dismissals in Innings=6-VST Naidu vs Andhra Pradesh

Most Wicket-keeper Dismissals in Match=9-VST Naidu vs Andhra Pradesh

Most Fielder Catches in Innings in first-class cricket=4-RV Uthappa vs Rajasthan

Most Fielder Catches in Match in first-class cricket=5-RV Uthappa vs Rajasthan

Highest Partnership=272-KL Rahul & CM Gautam vs Vidarbha

All-time Highest Run Scorer=621-RV Uthappa

All-time Highest Wicket taker=37-Sunil Joshi

Centurions

References

4. https://upload.wikimedia.org/wikipedia/commons/2/2f/Gangothri_Glades.jpg

External links

 Gangothri Glades Cricket Ground at ESPNcricinfo

Cricket grounds in Karnataka
University of Mysore
University sports venues in India
Sports venues in Mysore
Sports venues completed in 1997
1997 establishments in Karnataka
20th-century architecture in India